Santalum macgregorii is a species of plant in the Santalaceae family. It is found in possibly Indonesia and Papua New Guinea. It is threatened by habitat loss.

References

macgregorii
Endangered plants
Taxonomy articles created by Polbot